Jinshi is a town and the seat of Xinning County in Hunan, China. The town was formed through the amalgamation of Feixianqiao Township, Baisha Town and the former Jinshi Town on December 2, 2015. It is located in the south western Xinning County, it is bordered by Langshan Town to the south, Huanglong Town and Quanzhou County of Guangxi to the east, Gaoqiao Town and Wantang Township to the north, Shuimiao Town to the west.

Through the amalgamation of village-level divisions in 2016, its divisions were reduced to 55 from 85. , it has seven residential communities, 48 villages, and 6 other areas (including parks, farms, forest area, and research institute) under its jurisdiction. Its seat is Liujiajing Community.

References

External links
 Official Website

Xinning County
County seats in Hunan